MJP Racing Team Austria is an auto racing team founded by Austrian racing driver and entrepreneur Max Pucher.  The team has been competing in rallycross since its creation. The team uses Supercar specification Ford Fiesta built by MJP Racing. The cars were former built by Stohl Racing but before the 2016 season started Max Pucher separated his team from Stohl Racing and operates the cars by himself.

Racing record

Complete FIA World Rallycross Championship results
(key)

Supercar

* Season still in progress.

Complete FIA European Rallycross Championship results
(key)

Supercar

References

External links
 

Austrian auto racing teams
World Rallycross Championship teams
Auto racing teams established in 2014